The 1972 United States Senate election in South Dakota took place on November 7, 1972, concurrently with the U.S. presidential election as well as other elections to the United States Senate in other states as well as elections to the United States House of Representatives and various state and local elections.

Incumbent Republican U.S. Senator Karl E. Mundt, who had suffered a severe stroke in 1969, did not run for re-election to a fifth term and was succeeded by Democratic nominee James Abourezk.

Despite Abourezk's 14 percentage point win, Democratic presidential nominee and fellow South Dakota Senator George McGovern lost his home state by a margin of 8.6 points in the concurrent presidential election.

Primary elections 
Primary elections were held on June 6, 1972.

Democratic primary

Candidates 
 James Abourezk, incumbent U.S. Representative for South Dakota's 2nd congressional district
 George Blue, former State Senator and unsuccessful candidate for Democratic nomination for Lieutenant Governor of South Dakota in 1968

Results

Republican primary

Candidates 
 Robert W. Hirsch, former South Dakota Senate Majority Leader
 Chuck Lien, businessman
 Gordon J. Mydland, incumbent Attorney General of South Dakota
 Tom Reardon, banker
 Kenneth D. Stofferahn, farmer

Results 

A state convention was held June 26 to determine the party's nominee as no candidate received the 35% required for nomination under the state's primary law. Hirsch was nominated at this convention.

General election

Candidates 
 Robert W. Hirsch (R)
 James Abourezk (D)

Results

See also 
 1972 United States Senate elections

References

Bibliography
 
 

1972
South Dakota
United States Senate